Bhanugupta was one of the lesser known kings of the Gupta dynasty. He is only known  from an inscription in Eran, and a mention in the Manjushri-mula-kalpa. 

Only mentioned in the Eran inscription as a "Raja" and not a "Maharaja" or a "Maharajadhiraja" as would be customary for a Gupta Empire ruler, Bhanugupta may only have been a Governor for the region of Malwa, under Gupta Emperor Narasimhagupta.

Eran inscription of Bhanugupta
Bhanugupta is known from a stone pillar inscription in Eran, Malwa. The inscription was translated by John Faithfull Fleet in 1888, and then a second time in 1981, leading to different interpretations.

Initial translation (J.F Fleet 1888)
According to the initial translation of the Eran inscription (by John Faithful Fleet in 1888), Bhanugupta participated to a non-specific battle in 510 CE (Line 5). 

This translation was the basis for various conjectures about a possible encounter with Toramana, the Alchon Huns ruler. It has been suggested that Bhanugupta was involved in an important battle of his time, and suffered important losses, possibly against the Hun invader Toramana, whom he may or may not have defeated in 510. Mookerji actually considers, in view of the inscription, that Bhanugupta was vanquished by Toramana at this 510 CE Eran battle, so that the western Gupta province of Malwa fell into the hands of the Hunas at that point. Toramana would then have made his Eran boar inscription, claiming control of the region.

New translation (1981)
A new revised translation was published in 1981. Verses 3-4 are markedly differently translated, in that ruler Bhanugupta and his chieftain or noble Goparaja are said to have participated in a battle against the "Maittras" in 510 CE, thought to be the Maitrakas (the reading being without full certainty, but "as good as certain" according to the authors). This would eliminate the suggestion that Bhanugupta alluded to a battle with Toramana in his inscription.

Bhanugupta in the inscription is only mentioned as a "Raja" and not a "Maharaja" or a "Maharajadhiraja" as would be customary for a Gupta Empire ruler. Therefore he may only have been a Governor for the region of Malwa, under Gupta Emperor Narasimhagupta.

Manjushri-mula-kalpa
According to a 6th century CE Buddhist work, the Manjushri-mula-kalpa, "after the death of Budhagupta, two kings in Gupta line were crowned, one in Gauda and the other in Magadha", the latter being probably Narasimhagupta. According to this work, after Bhanu Gupta had lost Malwa, Toramana continued his conquest to Magadha, forcing Narasimhagupta Baladitya to make a retreat to Bengal. Toramana is said to have crowned a new king in Benares, named Prakataditya, who is presented as a son of Narasimha Gupta. Toramana then died in Benares as he was returning westward.

References

Sources
 

6th-century Indian monarchs
Gupta Empire